The Palm Harbor Open is a defunct tennis tournament that was played on the Grand Prix tennis circuit in 1980. The event was held in Palm Harbor, Florida and was played on outdoor hard courts.  Paul McNamee won the singles title while partnering with Paul Kronk to win the doubles title.

Past finals

Singles

Doubles

External links
 Singles draw
 Doubles draw

Grand Prix tennis circuit
Hard court tennis tournaments
Palm Harbor Open
ATP Tour
1980 in sports in Florida
1980 in American tennis
Sports in Pinellas County, Florida